Netley is a suburb 6.2 km (3 miles) west of Adelaide, South Australia, in the City of West Torrens. It is located about halfway from the Adelaide city centre to the coast, on the southeastern boundary of Adelaide Airport. The northern part, south of Richmond Road and west of Marion Road is predominantly industrial. South of Watson Avenue, the suburb is mainly residential in character, including both a kindergarten and retirement village. The Netley Primary School closed and merged with others to form William Light School for the 1998 school year.

External links
 Letter to the Principal, Netley Demonstration School (Undated; the school no longer exists.)

References and notes

Suburbs of Adelaide